Rampal Singh (born 4 January 1956, Udaipura in Raisen district) is an Indian politician, belonging to Bhartiya Janata Party. In the 2006 by-elections he was elected to the 14th Lok Sabha from the Vidisha Lok Sabha constituency of Madhya Pradesh.

Earlier life
He was also member of 10th and 11th Vidhan Sabha of Madhya Pradesh Assembly from Silwani - Begumgunj constituency between 1990 and 1998. He was again elected in 2003 and in 2013.
He was a former Minister of Public Works Department of Madhya Pradesh State Assembly.
He is an agriculturist. He is married to Smt Shashi Prabha Rajput. He has three sons and one daughter and resides at Raisen district.

References

India MPs 2004–2009
1956 births
Living people
People from Madhya Pradesh
People from Raisen district
Madhya Pradesh MLAs 1990–1992
Madhya Pradesh MLAs 1993–1998
Madhya Pradesh MLAs 2003–2008
Bharatiya Janata Party politicians from Madhya Pradesh